Ronald L. "Ron" Sargent (born 1955) was the chairman and CEO of Staples, Inc. until September 2016, when he was succeeded by Shira Goodman.

Early life 
In 1955 Sargent was born in Fort Thomas, Kentucky, U.S.

Education 
In 1977, Sargent earned a BA from Harvard University. In 1979, Sargent earned an MBA from Harvard Business School.

Career 
Sargent started his career in 1979, stocking shelves and operating the cash register at Kroger Co.

Sargent joined Staples in 1989. In 1991, Sargent become head of the Staples catalog division, and in 1997 he became head of North American operations. In 2002, Sargent became the CEO of Staples.

On May 31, 2016, Ron Sargent announced that he would step down as CEO of Staples after the company's annual shareholder meeting on June 14, 2016. The company's board of directors and Sargent mutually agreed that it was time for new management to step in to help Staples grow after Staples and Office Depot called off their $6 billion merger amid regulatory roadblocks. Sargent would remain a director and non-executive chairman through the end of the company's fiscal year in January 2017.

On February, 20th, 2017, Wells Fargo announced that Sargent was elected to their board as an independent director.  "Ron brings deep experience in consumer retail and marketing, as well as in the management of a large workforce serving customers globally through a variety of channels,” said Stephen Sanger, the chairman of the board.

References

Staples Inc. people
1955 births
American retail chief executives
Living people
Harvard Business School alumni
Harvard University alumni
Place of birth missing (living people)